Francisco da Cruz Delgado (born 28 September 1980 in Lisbon), commonly known as Chiquinho, is a Portuguese former footballer who played as a forward.

References

External links

Stats at InSports 

1980 births
Living people
Footballers from Lisbon
Portuguese footballers
Association football forwards
Primeira Liga players
Liga Portugal 2 players
Segunda Divisão players
U.D. Leiria players
Associação Naval 1º de Maio players
Sporting CP B players
Sporting CP footballers
S.C. Campomaiorense players
Imortal D.C. players
G.D. Chaves players
F.C. Marco players
Super League Greece players
Football League (Greece) players
Xanthi F.C. players
Panetolikos F.C. players
Thrasyvoulos F.C. players
Portuguese expatriate footballers
Expatriate footballers in Greece
Portuguese expatriate sportspeople in Greece